Yuri Nikolayevich Filatov (born 30 July 1948) is a Soviet-born Ukrainian sprint canoeist who competed in the 1970s. Competing in two Summer Olympics, he won two gold medals in the K-4 1000 m event, earning them in 1972 and 1976.

Filatov also won four medals in the K-4 1000 m event at the ICF Canoe Sprint World Championships with two golds (1970, 1971) and two silvers (1973, 1974).

References

External links
 
 

1948 births
Canoeists at the 1972 Summer Olympics
Canoeists at the 1976 Summer Olympics
Living people
Olympic canoeists of the Soviet Union
Olympic gold medalists for the Soviet Union
Soviet male canoeists
Ukrainian male canoeists
Olympic medalists in canoeing
ICF Canoe Sprint World Championships medalists in kayak
Medalists at the 1976 Summer Olympics
Medalists at the 1972 Summer Olympics
Sportspeople from Khmelnytskyi Oblast